Tycho is a prominent lunar impact crater located in the southern lunar highlands, named after the Danish astronomer Tycho Brahe (1546–1601). It is estimated to be 108 million years old.

To the south of Tycho is the crater Street, to the east is Pictet, and to the north-northeast is Sasserides. The surface around Tycho is replete with craters of various sizes, many overlapping still older craters. Some of the smaller craters are secondary craters formed from larger chunks of ejecta from Tycho.

Age and description
Tycho is a relatively young crater, with an estimated age of 108 million years (Ma), based on analysis of samples of the crater ray recovered during the  mission. This age initially suggested that the impactor may have been a member of the Baptistina family of asteroids, but as the composition of the impactor is unknown this remained conjecture.
However, this possibility was ruled out by the Wide-field Infrared Survey Explorer in 2011, as it was discovered that the Baptistina family was produced much later than expected, having formed approximately 80 million years ago.

The crater is sharply defined, unlike older craters that have been degraded by subsequent impacts. The interior has a high albedo that is prominent when the Sun is overhead, and the crater is surrounded by a distinctive ray system forming long spokes that reach as long as 1,500 kilometers. Sections of these rays can be observed even when Tycho is illuminated only by earthlight. Due to its prominent rays, Tycho is mapped as part of the Copernican System.

The ramparts beyond the rim have a lower albedo than the interior for a distance of over a hundred kilometers, and are free of the ray markings that lie beyond. This darker rim may have been formed from minerals excavated during the impact.

Its inner wall is slumped and terraced, sloping down to a rough but nearly flat floor exhibiting small, knobby domes. The floor displays signs of past volcanism, most likely from rock melt caused by the impact. Detailed photographs of the floor show that it is covered in a criss-crossing array of cracks and small hills.

Infrared observations of the lunar surface during an eclipse have demonstrated that Tycho cools at a slower rate than other parts of the surface, making the crater a "hot spot". This effect is caused by the difference in materials that cover the crater.

The rim of this crater was chosen as the target of the  mission. The robotic spacecraft safely touched down north of the crater in January 1968. The craft performed chemical measurements of the surface, finding a composition different from the maria. From this, one of the main components of the highlands was theorized to be anorthosite, an aluminium-rich mineral. The crater was also imaged in great detail by 

From the 1950s through the 1990s, NASA aerodynamicist Dean Chapman and others advanced the lunar origin theory of tektites. Chapman used complex orbital computer models and extensive wind tunnel tests to support the theory that the so-called Australasian tektites originated from the Rosse ejecta ray of Tycho. Until the Rosse ray is sampled, a lunar origin for these tektites cannot be ruled out.

This crater was drawn on lunar maps as early as 1645, when A.M.S. de Rheita depicted the bright ray system.

Names 
Tycho is named after the Danish astronomer Tycho Brahe. Like many of the craters on the Moon's near side, it was given its name by the Jesuit astronomer G.B. Riccioli, whose 1651 nomenclature system has become standardized. Earlier lunar cartographers had given the feature different names. Pierre Gassendi named it Umbilicus Lunaris ('the navel of the Moon'). van Langren's 1645 map calls it "Vladislai IV" after Władysław IV Vasa, King of Poland. And Johannes Hevelius named it 'Mons Sinai' after Mount Sinai.

Satellite craters 

By convention, these features are identified on lunar maps by placing the letter on the side of the crater midpoint that is closest to Tycho.

Fictional references 
 There is a chapter entitled "Tycho" in Jules Verne's Around the Moon (Autour de la Lune, 1870) which describes the crater and its ray system.

 In R.A. Heinlein's 1940 short story "Blowups Happen", a character speculates that Tycho may have been the location of a sentient race's main atomic power plant, in a past time when the Moon was still habitable—and that the plant exploded, causing the craters, the rays spreading from Tycho, and the death of all life on the Moon.

 C.D. Simak set his 1961 novelette The Trouble with Tycho, at the lunar crater. He also postulated that the crater's rays were composed of volcanic glass (tektites) akin to a theory postulated by NASA researchers Dean Chapman and John O'Keefe in the 1970s.

 In Heinlein's 1966 book The Moon Is a Harsh Mistress, Tycho is the location of the lunar habitat named "Tycho Under".

 Tycho was the location of the Tycho Magnetic Anomaly (TMA-1), and subsequent excavation of an alien monolith, in 2001: A Space Odyssey, the seminal 1968 science-fiction film by Stanley Kubrick and book by Arthur C. Clarke.

 In the 1987 film Can't Buy Me Love, Cindy notices Tycho while looking through a telescope on her final "contractual" date with Ronny in the Airplane Graveyard.

 It also serves as the location of "Tycho City" in the 1996 film Star Trek: First Contact; a lunar metropolis by the 24th century.

 In Jack Williamson's 2001 novel Terraforming Earth, the crater is utilized for "Tycho Base", a self-sustaining, robot-controlled installation aimed at restoring life to the (dead) planet Earth after an asteroid sterilizes the biosphere.

 In the 2019 film Ad Astra, the Moon base is situated in the Tycho crater. This is Roy's first stop on his journey to Mars.

 Crater Tycho figures prominently in the Matthew Looney and Maria Looney series of children's books set on the Moon, authored by Jerome Beatty.

 In R.M. Allen's Hunted Earth novels, the 'naked purples' own a former penal colony in or around Tycho crater known as "Tycho Purple Penal" (see The Ring of Charon).

 Tycho is referenced in the band Cojum Dip's song, Waltz in E Major, Op. 15 "Moon Waltz".

 Tycho is referenced in the 2022 game Horizon Forbidden West as the site of a Helium-3 mine.

Gallery

See also
1677 Tycho Brahe, minor planet
Tycho Brahe (Martian crater)
Tycho's Nova, bright supernova

References

External links

 
 . For more, see  
 
 
 
 

Impact craters on the Moon
Tycho Brahe